The Arauca River rises in the Andes Mountains of north-central Colombia and ends at the Orinoco in Venezuela.  For part of its run it is the boundary between Colombia and Venezuela.  The major city on its banks is Arauca, Colombia and El Amparo, Venezuela.

Course
The Arauca is typical of the rivers that flow east across the Llanos Orientales starting as a swift mountain stream and becoming wider and slower as it crosses the plains.

Initially, it is called the Chitagá, and it receives inflows from the Carabo and the Cacota, and then twists its course towards the east joining with the Culaga and the Bochaga. Its name then changes to the Margua. The Negro, the Colorado, and the San Lorenzo then flow into it.

From the right bank come the Cubugón and the Cobar from the Sierra Nevada de Chita. The Tunebo Indians call this stretch the Sarare. Now flowing across a flat zone, it divides to form the Charo Island.

From thin on, it takes the name Arauca in tribute to the Araucana tribe, which inhabited the mountain ranges of the upper course and belonged to the great Arawak family. Now in the savannas of the Llanos Orientales, it often becomes a braided river with the main course splitting to form the subsidiary channels, such as the one called Agua Limón.

Various subsidiary channels are used extensively for transportation from the town of Arauca down to its mouth on the Orinoco. The course of the river is 80 percent navigable in small boats.

References

External links 
Photographs of the Arauca River

Rivers of Colombia
Rivers of Venezuela
Colombia–Venezuela border crossings
Orinoco basin
Colombia–Venezuela border
International rivers of South America
Border rivers